Meerut Cantt. Assembly constituency is one of the 403 constituencies of the Uttar Pradesh Legislative Assembly, India. It is a part of the Meerut district and one of the five assembly constituencies in the Meerut Lok Sabha constituency. First election in this assembly constituency was held in 1957 after the "DPACO (1956)" order was passed and the constituency was constituted in 1956. The constituency was assigned identification number 47 after the "Delimitation of Parliamentary and Assembly Constituencies Order, 2008" was passed. In 1991 elections were not held in this constituency.

Wards / Areas
Extent of Meerut Cantt. Assembly constituency is Meerut (CB) & Ward Nos. 1, 6 to 9, 18, 23, 26, 30, 32, 37, 40, 44, 52, 59, 61, 63, 64, 66, 67 & 70 in Meerut (M Corp.) of Meerut Tehsil.

Members of the Legislative Assembly

Election results

2022

2017

See also
Meerut Lok Sabha constituency
Meerut district
Sixteenth Legislative Assembly of Uttar Pradesh
Uttar Pradesh Legislative Assembly

References

External links
 

Assembly constituencies of Uttar Pradesh
Meerut
Constituencies established in 1956
1956 establishments in Uttar Pradesh
Politics of Meerut district